Augusto Valdes Pangan, Sr. (March 12, 1932 – July 2, 1997), professionally known as Chiquito, was a Filipino actor and comedian.

Biography
Chiquito was born Augusto Valdes Pangan in Manila. His entertainment career began at the age of 13, when he appeared in a major musical production at the Manila Grand Opera House. In the next several years, he was a fixture in the Manila bodabil circuit, popular for his skill in dancing the boogie-woogie.

Chiquito was befriended by Fernando Poe, Sr., and with Poe's assistance, started a film career. He broke into films with Sanggano from Palaris Pictures. He would star in over a hundred films, mostly comedies, over the next five decades. He established his own production company, Sotang Bastos Productions, named after his favorite film role from the 1950s. He would ride on the crest of ever popular comedy spoofs of Hollywood genres such as the gangster film and the western. 

In one of these Western spoofs, The Arizona Kid (1971), he co-starred with Hollywood sex symbol Mamie Van Doren. Chiquito portrayed the very first male version of Darna in the film Terebol Dobol, preceding Dolphy, who only later came out with his own "portrayal" of the superheroine in Darna, Kuno?.

In 1984, Chiquito was nominated for a FAMAS Best Supporting Actor Award for his role in Lovingly Yours, Helen, a film dramatization of the radio and GMA television show hosted by Helen Vela. 

Chiquito also entered into local politics. He was elected three times as member of the local council of Makati, serving from 1969–72, 1988–89, and from 1995 until his death. He served a brief stint as appointed Vice Mayor of Makati from 1989 to 1992. In 1992, Chiquito made an unsuccessful bid to the Senate of the 9th Congress.

In 1994, Chiquito made a brief showbiz comeback when he teamed up with rapper-comedian Andrew E. in the movie "Pinagbiyak na Bunga (Lookalayk)" under Viva Films. The movie was a big success and later on had a television spin-off that same year entitled "Puno't Bunga" aired over GMA Network. He later had supporting roles in movies like "Ang Pagbabalik ni Pedro Penduko" (opposite Janno Gibbs), "Bangers" (with Joey de Leon and Andrew E.), and "Strict ang Parents Ko" (with Amanda Page).

Personal life
He was survived by his widow, Vilma Isidro-Pangan. The couple had seven children.

Death
Chiquito died at age 65 due to liver cancer at the Makati Medical Center on July 2, 1997. Philippine media called the day of his death "the day  the laughter died".

Filmography

1980 – Zodiac Connection [UNCONFIRMED] (Sotang Bastos Productions)
1980 – Si Ali-masag sa Maynila (Mercedes Films)
1983 – Estong Tutong, Ikalawang Yugto
1984 – Kung Tawagin Siya'y Bahala Na (Archer Productions)
1985 – Magbiro Ka sa Lasing, Huwag sa Bagong Gising (JPM/Prima)
1994 – Ang Pagbabalik ni Pedro Penduko (Viva Family Entertainment)
1994 – Pinagbiyak Na Bunga (Viva Films)
1995 – Bangers (Viva Films)
1995 – Ang Syota Kong Balikbayan (FPJ Productions)
1997 – Strict ang Parents Ko (Neo Films) - his last movie

Accolades
In 1984, Chiquito was nominated for a FAMAS Award for Best Supporting Actor for his role in Lovingly Yours, Helen, a film dramatization of the radio and GMA television show hosted by Helen Vela.

See also
Maria Teresa Carlson

Notes

References

External links

1932 births
1997 deaths
20th-century comedians
20th-century Filipino male actors
Burials at the Manila North Cemetery
Deaths from cancer in the Philippines
Filipino actor-politicians
Filipino male comedians
Kapampangan people
Kilusang Bagong Lipunan politicians
Male actors from Metro Manila
Metro Manila city and municipal councilors
People from Makati